tivùsat is a free-to-air/free-to-view digital satellite television platform, launched by the joint venture tivù s.r.l. between RAI, Mediaset and Telecom Italia Media, and serving Italy, Vatican City and San Marino. With the exception of international news services carried in English, services are provided in Italian.

The service has been marketed since 31 July 2009 and offers a satellite alternative for many of those unable to receive the digital terrestrial television in Italy. Tivù Sat comprises free-to-air and free-to-view channels available on national television networks, and can be watched using a subscription card for Italian users purchasing a compatible receiver with Nagravision scrambling system. It uses Eutelsat's Hot Bird satellites at 13 degrees east.

Television channels

 Rai 1 (HD)
 Rai 2 (HD)
 Rai 3 (HD)
 Rai 4 (HD)
 Rai 5 (HD)
 Rai Movie (HD)
 Rai Premium (HD)
 Rai News 24 (HD)
 Rai Storia (HD)
 Rai Sport (HD)
 Rai Gulp (HD)
 Rai YoYo (HD)
 Rai Scuola (HD)
 Rete 4 (HD)
 Canale 5 (HD)
 Italia 1 (HD)
 Mediaset Italia 2 (HD)
 Mediaset Extra (HD)
 La5 (HD)
 27Twentyseven (HD) 
 Iris (HD)
 Top Crime (HD)
 20 Mediaset (HD)
 Focus (HD)
 TgCom24 (HD)
 Boing (SD)
 Cartoonito (SD)
 Super! (SD)
 Real Time (HD)
 NTN (SD)
 WELL TV (SD)
 DMAX (HD)
 Giallo (HD)
 Motor Trend (HD)
 Food Network (HD)
 HGTV (HD)
 La 7d (HD)
 Cielo (HD)
 TV8 (HD)
 NOVE (HD) i 
 Radio Freccia (HD)
 Radio Italia TV (HD)
 RTL 102.5 (HD)
 Radio Zeta (HD)
 Radio Kisskiss (HD)
 Radio Italia Trend TV (HD)
 Padre Pio TV (HD)
 Telepace (HD)
 TV2000 (HD)
 NTN (SD)
 BBC One (HD)
 BBC World (HD)
 Sky TG24 (HD)
 Sharing TV (SD)
 Al Jazeera English HD
 CGTN English HD
 CGTN Documentary  HD
 Fox News Channel HD
 Love Nature HD
 The Fight Network HD
 CNNI HD
 HotBird 4K1 (UHD)
 Rai 4K (UHD HDR)
 Nasa TV UHD (UHD)
 Museum 4K (UHD)
 MyZen 4K (UHD)
 TRAVELXP 4K (UHD)
 Fashion TV (UHD)

Radio channels

 Radio 1 (HD)
 Radio 2 (HD)
 Radio 3 (HD)
 Rai GR Parlamento (HD)
 Rai Radio1 Sport (HD)
 Rai Radio2 Indie (HD)
 Rai Radio3 Classica (HD)
 Rai Radio Kids (HD)
 Rai Radio Live (HD)
 Rai Radio Tutta Italiana (HD)
 Rai Radio Techete' (HD)
 Rai Radio Trst A  (HD)
 Radio 1 L'Ora della Venezia Giulia (HD)
 RDS (SD)
 DimSuono Roma (SD)
 RTL 102.5 (SD)
 RADIO ZETA (SD)
 RADIO FRECCIA (SD)
 Radio 105 (SD)
 Virgin Radio (SD)
 Radio R101 (SD)
 Radio Monte Carlo (SD)
 RMC2 (SD)
 M DUE O (SD)
 Radio Capital (SD)
 Radio DEEJAY (HD)
 Radio 24  (SD)
 Discoradio (SD)
 R.ONDA D'URTO (SD)
 Radio ANNI '60 (SD)
 Radio Sintony Cagliari (SD)
 Radio Supersound Sardegna (SD)
 Radio Number One (SD)
 Radio Radio (SD)
 Radio Maria (SD)
 Radio Mater (SD)
 Radio popolare (HD)
 Radio Margherita (HD)
 Radio Kiss Kiss (HD)
 Radio Sportiva (HD)
 RFI francais (SD)
 Swiss pop (HD)
 Swiss jazz (HD)
  Swiss Classic (HD)
  DW-FM02 (HD)

References

External links
 

Mediaset
Rai (broadcaster)
Telecom Italia Media
Television in Italy
Direct broadcast satellite services
Television in San Marino
Television in Vatican City
2009 establishments in Italy
2009 establishments in San Marino
2009 establishments in Vatican City